Max Landstein (born 20 April 1933) is a Scottish-American film and television actor. He is perhaps best known for playing the comic foil in multiple episodes of The Monkees, most notably as "Mr. Zero" in "The Devil and Peter Tork". He began his career in Britain before moving to the United States in 1963. He also had a career in Paris in the mid-50s as emcee in cabarets and jazz clubs (Crazy Horse, Club Saint-Germain, etc.) -he played his own role later in Charade (1963)- and choreographer for the French vocal group The Blue Stars of France.

Partial filmography 

The Mouse That Roared (1959) - Cobbley 
School for Scoundrels (1960) - Fleetsnod
The Pure Hell of St Trinian's (1960) - Octavius
On the Fiddle (1961) - Conductor
Play It Cool (1962) - Horace - the Beatnik Man
Village of Daughters (1962) - Faccino
Live Now, Pay Later (1962) - Arnold 
On the Beat (1962) - Mr. Bassett
What a Crazy World (1963) - Solly Gold
Charade (1963) - Master of Ceremonies at Les Black Sheep Club (uncredited)
Double Trouble (1967) - Georgie 
Batman (1967, TV Series) - Basil
Rowan & Martin's Laugh-In (1967, Pilot only) - Self
The Monkees (1967–1968, TV Series) - Oraculo / Mr. Zero / Pshaw / Shah-Ku / Duce / Zeckenbush / King
Targets (1968) - Marshall Smith
Myra Breckinridge (1970) - Vince
Hawaii Five-O (1971, TV Series) - Tony Madrid
Young Frankenstein (1974) - Gravedigger #1
Linda Lovelace for President (1975) - B.S.
The Feather and Father Gang (1976–1977, TV Series) - Michael
Yellowbeard (1983) - Prison Guard
Body Double (1984) - Sid Goldberg
Pee-wee's Big Adventure (1985) - Mario
Real Genius (1985) - Dr. Dodd
Sledge Hammer! (1987–1988, TV Series) - Hotel Manager / Scotland Yard Inspector McCall
The Underachievers (1987) - Carruthers
The Golden Girls (1987, TV Series) - Victor
Heart Condition (1990) - Beverly Palm Hotel Waiter

References

External links 
 
 

1933 births
Living people
Male actors from Glasgow
Scottish male film actors
Scottish male television actors
20th-century Scottish male actors
Scottish emigrants to the United States
American male film actors
American male television actors
20th-century American male actors